Camp Uncas is an  Adirondack Great Camp, the second built by William West Durant for his own use.  It lies on the shore of  Lake Mohegan, near Great Camp Sagamore, and was completed in two years.

Previously Durant had built  Camp Pine Knot, which he sold to industrialist Collis P. Huntington, due to financial difficulties

History
The camp was built of logs felled on the property, and all iron hardware was forged on site. In the main lodge and dining hall, the log construction was unusual in that the logs were not interlocked, as in conventional log buildings, but rather were pinned together at beveled corners. Floors, walls and ceilings were all of polished planks and peeled and polished natural logs.

After Morgan's death in 1913, the camp stayed in the Morgan family until 1947, when it was sold to the widow of Alfred Gwynne Vanderbilt, who also owned Sagamore. General and Mrs. George Marshall, as guests of Mrs. Vanderbilt, entertained Madame Chiang Kai-shek at Uncas in 1949. Mrs. Vanderbilt left Uncas to a foundation, which sold it; eventually it was bought by the Rockland County Boy Scouts who used it as a camp. In 1975, it was returned to private use.

The camp was included in a multiple property submission for listing on the National Register of Historic Places in 1986, and was listed there in 1987.  The camp was designated a National Historic Landmark on October 7, 2008.

References

Sources
 Gilborn, Craig. Durant: Fortunes and Woodland Camps of a Family in the Adirondacks.  Utica, NY: North Country Books, 1981.
 Gilborn, Craig.  Adirondack Camps:  Homes Away from Home, 1850-1950.  Blue Mountain Lake, NY:  Adirondack Museum;  Syracuse:  Syracuse University Press, 2000.
 Kaiser, Harvey.  Great Camps of the Adirondacks. Boston:  David R. Godine, 1982.

External links
 St. Hubert's Isle - Great Camps - Camp Uncas
  New York Times, "Preserving Adirondacks Great Camps", June 11, 1992

Adirondack Great Camps
National Historic Landmarks in New York (state)
Buildings and structures in Hamilton County, New York
National Register of Historic Places in Hamilton County, New York
Residential buildings on the National Register of Historic Places in New York (state)